"(Back Home Again in) Indiana" is a song composed by James F. Hanley with lyrics by Ballard MacDonald that was published in January 1917. Although it is not the state song of Indiana (which is "On the Banks of the Wabash, Far Away"), it is perhaps the best-known song that pays tribute to the Hoosier state.

An Indiana signature 

The tune was introduced as a Tin Pan Alley pop song of the time. It contains a musical quotation from the already well known "On the Banks of the Wabash, Far Away", as well as repetition of words from the lyrics: candlelight, moonlight, fields, new-mown hay, sycamores, and the Wabash River.

Since 1946, the chorus of "Back Home Again in Indiana" has been performed during pre-race ceremonies before the Indianapolis 500. During the song, thousands of multicolored balloons are released from an infield tent. The balloon release dates back to 1947, and has coincided with the song since about 1950. From 1972 to 2014, the song was performed most often by Jim Nabors. He admitted to having the song's lyrics written on his hand during his inaugural performance, and occasionally his versions altered several of the words. The vocals are supported by the Purdue All-American Marching Band. In 2014, Nabors performed the song for the final time after announcing his retirement earlier that year, saying: "You know, there's a time in life when you have to move on. I'll be 84 this year. I just figured it was time ... This is really the highlight of my year to come here. It's very sad for me, but nevertheless there's something inside of me that tells me when it's time to go."

After Nabors retired, the honor of singing the song was done on a rotating basis (which had also been the case prior to Nabors becoming the regular singer) in 2015 and 2016. A cappella group Straight No Chaser performed in 2015 and the Spring 2014 winner of The Voice Josh Kaufman accompanied by the Indianapolis Children's Choir performed in 2016. The Speedway has returned to a standard singer starting in 2017, with Jim Cornelison doing it for six runnings as of the 2022 race.

A jazz standard 
 In 1917 it was one of the current pop tunes selected by Columbia Records to be recorded by the Original Dixieland Jazz Band, (ODJB), who released it as a 78 with "Darktown Strutters' Ball". This lively instrumental version by the ODJB was one of the earliest jazz records issued and sold well. The tune became a jazz standard. For years, Louis Armstrong and his All Stars would open every public performance with the number.

Its chord changes undergird the Miles Davis composition "Donna Lee", one of jazz's best known contrafacts, a composition that lays a new melody over an existing harmonic structure. Lesser known contrafacts of "Indiana" include Fats Navarro's "Ice Freezes Red" and Lennie Tristano's "Ju-Ju".

In 1934, Joe Young, Jean Schwartz, and Joe Ager wrote "In a Little Red Barn (On a Farm Down in Indiana)", which not only incorporated all the same key words and phrases above, but whose chorus had the same harmonic structure as "Indiana". In this respect it was a contrafact of the latter.

Cover versions
 Original Dixieland Jazz Band, 1917
 Eddie Condon with Frank Teschemacher and Gene Krupa, 1928
 Red Nichols, 1929
 Casa Loma Orchestra, 1932
 Chu Berry with Hot Lips Page, 1937
 Lester Young with Nat King Cole, 1942
 Lester Young with Count Basie, 1944
 Don Byas with Slam Stewart, 1945
 Bud Powell, 1947
 Louis Armstrong, An Evening with Louis Armstrong at Pasadena Civic Auditorium, 1951
 Dave Brubeck, Interchanges ‘54
 Bobby Darin and Johnny Mercer, Two of a Kind, 1961
Richard "Groove" Holmes, On Basie's Bandstand, 1966
 Joe Venuti and Zoot Sims, Joe and Zoot, 1973
 Glen Campbell, live on The Tonight Show, 1973
 Bonnie Koloc, Wild and Recluse, 1978
 Dick Wellstood with Kenny Davern, The Blue Three at Hanratty's, 1981
 Straight No Chaser, The New Old Fashioned, 2015

Usage in movies
 Remember the Night, 1940: One of the main themes of the movie.
 Home in Indiana, 1944: it is used as both incidental and background music throughout, often in a sophisticated rearrangement by Hugo Friedhofer.
 The Monte Carlo Story, 1956: Marlene Dietrich sings the song for Arthur O'Connell.
 The Five Pennies, 1959: The song is featured in several scenes as Danny Kaye portrays the life of trumpeter Red Nichols.

See also 
 List of pre-1920 jazz standards

References

External links 
 Song lyrics on Wikisource

Songs with lyrics by Ballard MacDonald
1917 songs
1910s jazz standards
Louis Armstrong songs
Music of Indiana
Songs written by James F. Hanley
Indianapolis 500